Tudorel Stoica (born 7 September 1954, in Brăila, Brăila County, Romania) is a Romanian retired footballer who played as a central midfielder.  He is the most capped player in the history of Steaua București.

He is one of the most famous and successful players who has ever played in the Romanian First League. He is 2nd in an all time ranking, tied with Giedrius Arlauskis, Ciprian Deac, Adrian Bumbescu, Mircea Lucescu and Dumitru Stângaciu, all with 7 championships won. Marius Lăcătuș won it 10 times and is ranked 1st.

Club career
Stoica made his Romanian first division debuts with FCM Galaţi in 1974, having previously played for CSU Galaţi in the second league.

After only one season, he transferred to country giants Steaua București where, safe for his first year, he was a nuclear midfield element as the team won – that season included – seven league titles and five domestic cups. He was a main player and captain of the squad that won the first European title in Romanian football's history, the 1985–86 European Cup, even though he did not play in the final against FC Barcelona, because of accumulation of yellow cards.

In 1989, 35-year-old Stoica moved abroad for the first time, playing one season in France with second level side RC Lens, returning to Steaua where he finished his career at the age of 37. The longtime team captain amassed totals of 369 games and 43 goals (377 counting with FCM Galaţi) in his country's top division, over the course of 15 professional seasons; in the early 1990s, he had brief spells as assistant manager with Steaua București and as head coach Romania U21.

On 25 March 2008, Stoica was decorated by Romanian president Traian Băsescu with the Ordinul "Meritul Sportiv" – ("The Sportive Merit" Order) class II, for his part in the winning of the 1986 European Cup.

International career
During eight years, Stoica was capped 15 times for the Romania national team, but did not attend any major international tournament.

He made his debut on 14 October 1979 in a 1–3 friendly loss with the Soviet Union.

Honours
Steaua București
Divizia A: 1975–76, 1977–78, 1984–85, 1985–86, 1986–87, 1987–88, 1988–89
Romanian Cup: 1975–76, 1978–79, 1984–85, 1986–87, 1988–89
European Cup: 1985–86
UEFA Super Cup: 1986

Personal
After retiring from football, Stoica served as scout for Belgian team R.S.C. Anderlecht. His son, Alin, was also a footballer and a midfielder. He also represented Steaua and the Romania national team, and played mainly in Belgium, representing four teams.

References

External links

1954 births
Living people
Romanian footballers
Association football midfielders
Liga I players
Liga II players
FCM Dunărea Galați players
FC Steaua București players
Ligue 2 players
RC Lens players
Romania international footballers
Romanian expatriate footballers
Expatriate footballers in France
Romanian football managers
FC Steaua București assistant managers
Romanian expatriate sportspeople in France
Sportspeople from Brăila